Tranøya is an island in Senja Municipality in Troms og Finnmark county, Norway. The  island is almost totally uninhabited. There is one farm area on the eastern side of the island. The farm is also the site of the historic Tranøy Church. Today the farm is owned by the local government and used as a retirement and assisted living facility. There is also a small museum on the site.

See also
List of islands of Norway

References

Senja
Islands of Troms og Finnmark